The Yablonoi Mountains or Yablonovy Mountains (Yablony nuruu) are a mountain range, in Transbaikal (mainly in Zabaykalsky Krai), Siberia, Russia. The range is sparsely inhabited with most settlements engaged in mining. The area is especially rich in tin. The city of Chita lies between the Yablonoi Mountains to the west and the Chersky Range to the east.

The Trans-Siberian Railroad passes the mountains at Chita and runs parallel to the range before going through a tunnel to bypass the heights.

Geography
They rise mostly in the western part of the Zabaikalsky Krai, with a small section in the southeastern part of Buryatia. The Vitim Plateau lies to the north and the Borshchovochny Range to the east of the range.

The Vitim River flows at the northwestern edge of the range, together with its tributaries the Konda and the Karenga, which flow northeastwards. To the southwest flow the Khilok and the Ingoda and in the northeast the Olyokma.

Flora
The slopes of the Yablonoviy Range are covered with larch and occasional fir and silver fir taiga. Pine forests are quite common on the southern slopes of the range. Peaks higher than 1,200 - 1,400 metres are covered with mountain tundra with bare summits (golets) at higher altitudes.

See also
List of mountains and hills of Russia

References

External links

The Permian of the Transbaikal region, eastern Russia: Biostratigraphy, correlation and biogeography
Physiogeography of the Russian Far East

Mountain ranges of Russia
Landforms of Zabaykalsky Krai
South Siberian Mountains